Nigrosabulum is a genus of fungi in the Hypocreales order. The relationship of this taxon to other taxa within the order is unknown (incertae sedis), and it has not yet been placed with certainty into any family.

References

External links

Hypocreales genera
Hypocreales incertae sedis
Fungi described in 1970